The 1953 Arizona State–Flagstaff Lumberjacks football team was an American football team that represented Arizona State College at Flagstaff (now known as Northern Arizona University) in the New Mexico Conference (NMC) during the 1953 college football season. In their third and final year under head coach John Pederson, the Lumberjacks compiled a 4–5 record and was outscored by a total of 166 to 126.

After the 1952 season, the Lumberjacks left the Border Conference and joined the NMC. In their first season in the NMC, they compiled a 3–3 record against conference opponents, finishing in a three-way tie for third place in the seven-team conference.

The team played its home games at Skidmore Field in Flagstaff, Arizona.

Schedule

References

Arizona State-Flagstaff
Northern Arizona Lumberjacks football seasons
Arizona State-Flagstaff Lumberjacks football